Mariano Díaz Bravo (born 19 August 1929, in Rancagua, Chile) is a Chilean-born Venezuelan photographer, graphic designer and writer, best known for his contributions to the study and promotion of Venezuelan folk art. In 1993, he received the Premio Nacional de Arte Popular "Aquiles Nazoa" (Popular Culture National Prize), Venezuela's highest honor for folk artists and folk art promoters.

Biography
Mariano Díaz was born on 19 August 1929, in the city of Rancagua, 87 km south of Chile's capital, Santiago. From 1954 to 1960, Díaz worked as a graphic designer for the University of Chile's Experimental Theater Department. Then, in 1960 he moved to Caracas, Venezuela, invited by the Universidad Central de Venezuela. In Venezuela he worked as a photojournalist, graphic designer and writer for several Venezuelan newspapers and magazines, including La Esfera, El Mundo, La República, and El Nacional. He was Director of Publications for the Universidad de Oriente, Director of Art and Publications Advisor for the President's Central Information Office and Publications Coordinator for CVF. Since 1978, Díaz has exclusively worked as a free-lance writer and graphic designer.

In the late 1970s, Díaz also begins photographing, documenting and collecting Venezuelan folk art, interviewing folk artists and promoting their works. Since the 1980s, he has published several books that portray some of the most representative Venezuelan folk artists, including Feliciano Carvallo and Sixto Sarmiento.

He has won several prizes for his photographic works, including the Venezuelan National Council for Culture CONAC first prize for photography (1984)

As a tribute to his publications and continuing support of Venezuelan folk art, Díaz was awarded the Premio Nacional de Arte Popular "Aquiles Nazoa" (Popular Culture National Prize) in 1993.

In March, 2008, the Venezuelan National Museums Foundation bought 150 pieces of Díaz's folk art private collection, which are now part of a permanent exhibit at the Venezuelan National Folk Art Museum in Petare, Venezuela.

Published works

References

External links
 Se enriquece la colección del Museo Nacional de Arte Popular
 Colección de memoria y reconocimiento

1929 births
Living people
People from Rancagua
Venezuelan male writers
Venezuelan photographers
Chilean male writers
Chilean photographers
Chilean emigrants to Venezuela
Mass media in Venezuela